In Greek mythology, Lamedon (Ancient Greek: Λαμέδων) also known as Laomedon, was the 18th king of Sicyon who reigned for 40 years.

Family 
Lamedon was the younger son of King Coronus the Sicyonian, and brother to King Corex. He was married Pheno, daughter of the Athenian Clytius, and had by her a daughter Zeuxippe.

Mythology 
After his older brother died without issue, Lamedon was to succeed him, but the kingdom was seized by Epopeus. However, Epopeus died of a wound he had received in the battle against Nycteus, and Lamedon took over as his heir; according to Pausanias, Lamedon was responsible for giving Antiope up to Lycus.

Later, when Lamedon was engaged in a military conflict against Archander and Architeles (sons of Achaeus and the husbands of the Danaïdes Scaea and Automate), he had Sicyon of Attica for an ally. In reward for Sicyon's assistance, Lamedon gave him Zeuxippe to wife and pronounced him his successor.

Notes

Princes in Greek mythology
Mythological kings of Sicyon
Kings in Greek mythology

References 

 Pausanias, Description of Greece with an English Translation by W.H.S. Jones, Litt.D., and H.A. Ormerod, M.A., in 4 Volumes. Cambridge, MA, Harvard University Press; London, William Heinemann Ltd. 1918. . Online version at the Perseus Digital Library
 Pausanias, Graeciae Descriptio. 3 vols. Leipzig, Teubner. 1903.  Greek text available at the Perseus Digital Library.

Sicyonian characters in Greek mythology